Roscoe Word (born July 24, 1952) is a retired American football cornerback and return specialist who played in the National Football League (NFL) for the New York Jets, Buffalo Bills, New York Giants, and the Tampa Bay Buccaneers.  He played college football at Jackson State University.

References

1952 births
Living people
American football cornerbacks
Buffalo Bills players
Jackson State Tigers football players
New York Giants players
New York Jets players
Tampa Bay Buccaneers players
Sportspeople from Pine Bluff, Arkansas
Players of American football from Arkansas